Zlatar-Bistrica is a village and municipality in northwestern Croatia, in the Krapina-Zagorje County. It lies on the crossroads of two important roads for the region, one connecting northern parts of the county with Zagreb (D29) and the other connecting Varaždin and western part of the county (D24) and is also connected by R201 railway.

What is today Zlatar-Bistrica, until 1912 was actually just couple of small villages - Gornji Brestovec, Donji Brestovec and Grančari.
As the railroads connected Zagreb and Varaždin, a rail station was built between Zlatar and Marija Bistrica and it was named Zlatar-Bistrica. Today's Zlatar-Bistrica grew in the rail station's surroundings.

With its 2600 inhabitants (2011 census), it is considered one of the smaller municipalities in the county. Until 1991 it was the administrative center of the municipality of Zlatar Bistrica, which included today's municipalities of Budinšćina, Hrašćina, Konjščina, Lobor, Mihovljan, Zlatar and Zlatar-Bistrica. At the time, with just over 33,000 inhabitants, it  was the biggest municipality of the county.

Until it was divided in 1991, Zlatar-Bistrica was also the economic stronghold with several small, medium and even a big companies operating there. Wood and meat-processing as well as electric equipment are produced there.

Culturally, Zlatar-Bistrica was neglected for many years in favour of neighbouring Zlatar. Nowadays there's a strong association that works on cultural matters in Zlatar Bistrica under name of KUD "Kaj".

Sports association include soccer team NK "Ivančica" and both gender handball teams - ŽRK "Zlatar-Bistrica" and RK "Zlatar-Bistrica".

Sources

External links
 
 Sportska dvorana u Zlatar Bistrici

Municipalities of Croatia
Populated places in Krapina-Zagorje County